St Everilda's Church lies in Nether Poppleton, a village immediately north-west of York, in England.

The church is one of only two in the country dedicated to Everilda, an Anglo-Saxon saint who established a monastic community which may have been in Poppleton, although it is usually placed in Everingham.  A church was in existence by 1088, at which time its advowson was granted to the newly founded St Mary's Abbey, York.

The church was rebuilt in the twelfth-century, and much of the material from that period survives.  It is built of limestone, some finely cut and other sections of rubble.  In 1778, galleries were added on the north and west side of the nave, and part of the north wall was rebuilt in brick.  Further alterations took place in the 19th-century, and the west door probably dates from this period.

Some of the windows in the chancel contain 14th-century stained glass, while those in the nave are square-headed and of later date.  In the chancel, there are three 17th-century memorials to members of the Hutton family.  In the east wall of the vestry is a carving of a cross, believed to date from the 13th-century.  In 1939, a new altar, carved by Robert Thompson, was installed.  An extension was added in 2015, providing a kitchen and storage space.  The building has been grade II* listed since 1966.

References

Nether Poppleton
Nether Poppleton